Golshekanan castle is a historical castle located in Isfahan Province in Ardestan County, The longevity of this fortress dates back to the Safavid dynasty.

References 

Castles in Iran